Mount Axworthy is a mountain in the northwest part of the Dana Mountains in Palmer Land. It was mapped by the United States Geological Survey from ground surveys and from U.S. Navy air photos, 1961–67, and named by the Advisory Committee on Antarctic Names for Charles S. Axworthy, a hospital corpsman and leader of the support personnel with the Palmer Station winter party in 1965.

References
 

Mountains of Palmer Land